Hezekiah Russel Holland (born September 18, 1936) is an American lawyer and jurist who serves as a senior United States district judge on the United States District Court for the District of Alaska.

Education and career

Born in Pontiac, Michigan, Holland received a Bachelor of Business Administration from the University of Michigan's Ross School of Business in 1958 and a Bachelor of Laws from the University of Michigan Law School in 1961. He was a law clerk to Buell A. Nesbett, chief justice of the Alaska Supreme Court, from 1961 to 1963. He was an Assistant United States Attorney of the Anchorage, Alaska division from 1963 to 1965. He then entered private practice at Stevens & Savage, the law firm of future U.S. Senator Ted Stevens. Holland became a partner in the firm and its name was changed to Stevens, Savage & Holland. Holland was in private practice until 1984.

Federal judicial service

On March 6, 1984, Holland was nominated by President Ronald Reagan to a seat on the United States District Court for the District of Alaska vacated by Judge James von der Heydt. Holland was confirmed by the United States Senate on March 26, 1984, and received his commission on July 16, 1984. He served as Chief Judge from 1989 to 1995, assuming senior status on September 18, 2001.

Holland serves as a visiting judge in the District of Arizona, having first presided over a case in that court in 1993. He has heard 835 cases in the District of Arizona. Notable trials he handled were 2014's United States v. Town of Colorado City, Ariz., et al., in which the local government was controlled by leaders from FLDS sect of Mormonism, and consolidated Theranos litigation (Toy v. Theranos, Inc., et al.) from October 2016 until June 2020 when he requested it be reassigned.

Notable cases

Holland presided over the litigation ensuing after the Exxon Valdez disaster.

He was formerly (until June 2020) the presiding judge in a class action lawsuit against Theranos founder Elizabeth Holmes.

Association

Holland is a member of the Petroleum Club, a social organization that has many members associated with the oil industry.

References

Sources
 

1936 births
Living people
People from Pontiac, Michigan
Lawyers from Anchorage, Alaska
Judges of the United States District Court for the District of Alaska
United States district court judges appointed by Ronald Reagan
20th-century American judges
Ross School of Business alumni
University of Michigan Law School alumni
Assistant United States Attorneys
21st-century American judges